Wangtan is a town in Keqiao District, Shaoxing, Zhejiang, China. , it administers Shunjiangyuan Residential Community and the following 24 villages:
Wangtan Village
Zhaohu Village
Kanshang Village
Shadi Village
Jiangxiang Village
Tenghao Village
Wangcheng Village
Dong Village
Changling Village
Shu Village
Shangwang Village
Zhangjiang Village
Sun'ao Village
Yuzhai Village
Yinsha Village
Danjia Village
Xinjian Village
Qingtan Village
Xinhua Village
Yuelian Village
Nan'an Village
Xinlian Village
Shunhuang Village
Wanqiao Village

References 

Towns of Zhejiang
Shaoxing